This list of Alabama state parks covers state parks in the Alabama park system. As of 2023, there were 21 official Alabama state parks run in part or exclusively by the Alabama Department of Conservation and Natural Resources and three historic state parks run by other authorities.

Current parks

Historic state parks

Former state parks

References

External links

 Alabama State Parks Alabama Department of Conservation and Natural Resources

 
Alabama state parks